Ghezzi is an Italian surname.

Geographical distribution
As of 2014, 84.5% of all known bearers of the surname Ghezzi were residents of Italy (frequency 1:4,372), 4.9% of Argentina (1:52,705), 3.2% of the United States (1:679,044), 2.0% of France (1:204,011), 1.5% of Switzerland (1:33,113) and 1.3% of Brazil (1:917,095).

In Italy, the frequency of the surname was higher than national average (1:4,372) in the following regions:
 1. Lombardy (1:996)
 2. Trentino-Alto Adige/Südtirol (1:2,297)
 3. Tuscany (1:2,705)
 4. Emilia-Romagna (1:3,927)

People
Andrea Ghezzi (born 2001), Italian footballer
Carlo Ghezzi, professor and chair of software engineering at the Politecnico di Milano
Dori Ghezzi ((born 1946), Italian singer
Gioia Ghezzi (born 1962), Italian Manager
Giorgio Ghezzi (1930–1990), Italian soccer player
Giuseppe Ghezzi (1634–1721), Italian painter
Ippolito Ghezzi (1650–1709), Italian composer and Augustinian friar
John J. Ghezzi (1911–1938), American lawyer
Luca Ghezzi (born 1978), Italian rower
Maria Ghezzi (1927–2021), Italian designer, illustrator, and painter
Pier Leone Ghezzi (1674–1755), Italian painter
Pierangelo Ghezzi, Italian astronomer
Sebastiano Ghezzi (1580–1645), Italian painter
Vic Ghezzi (1910–1976), American golfer

See also
Ghezzi & Brian, an Italian motorcycle company 
Estadio Emiliano Ghezzi, a stadium in Paraguay

References

Italian-language surnames
Surnames of Italian origin